Ole Petter Pollen (born 16 September 1966) is a Norwegian sailor, world champion in Europe (dinghy) and Olympic medalist in Flying Dutchman.

Sailing career
Pollen became World Champion in Europe (dinghy) in 1985. He won a silver medal in the Flying Dutchman Class at the 1988 Summer Olympics in Seoul, together with Erik Bjørkum. Pollen and Bjørkum won a silver medal at the 1988 European Championships, and a bronze medal at the 1989 Flying Dutchman World Championship.

Pollen resides at Stabekk.

References

External links
 
 
 

1966 births
Living people
Norwegian male sailors (sport)
Olympic sailors of Norway
Olympic silver medalists for Norway
Olympic medalists in sailing
Sailors at the 1988 Summer Olympics – Flying Dutchman
Sailors at the 1992 Summer Olympics – Flying Dutchman
Medalists at the 1988 Summer Olympics
World champions in sailing for Norway
Europe class world champions
Sportspeople from Bærum